Yannick Gagneur (born 15 March 1980 in Paris, France) is a French basketball player who played for French Pro A league club Nancy.

References

1980 births
Living people
French men's basketball players
SLUC Nancy Basket players
Spirou Charleroi players
Basketball players from Paris
SIG Basket players
Virtus Bologna players
Small forwards